Major John Waller Hills PC (1867 – 24 December 1938) was a British Liberal Unionist and Conservative politician and author.

The second son of Herbert Augustus and Anna Hills of High Head Castle, Cumberland, Hills was educated at Eton and Balliol College, Oxford. In 1897 he married Stella Duckworth, step-daughter of Leslie Stephen. Three months into the marriage, Stella was taken ill with peritonitis, and died. Nevertheless, Hills retained a close connection with his wife's family after her death, including her half-sisters Virginia Woolf and Vanessa Bell. Woolf professed to dislike him, comparing his appearance to that of "an excellent highly polished well seasoned brown boot."

During World War I he served as a captain in the 4th Battalion of the Durham Light Infantry. He was promoted to the rank of Major in October 1915 and Acting Lieutenant-Colonel of the 20th Battalion in July 1916. He was wounded in September 1916, and mentioned in dispatches.

He was Liberal Unionist Member of Parliament (MP) for City of Durham from 1906 to 1918 and for the successor Durham City Division from 1918 to 1922, and Conservative member for Ripon from December 1925, following his victory in the by-election. He held ministerial office as Financial Secretary to the Treasury from 1922 to 1923.

In 1923, he was appointed by the government to the board of what would become Imperial Airways.

He was appointed a Privy Counsellor in 1929. He was due to be conferred a baronetcy in the 1939 New Year Honours but died before he could receive it. His five-year-old son Andrew Ashton Waller Hills was created a baronet, of Hills Court in the County of Kent, in his stead, whilst his wife was granted the style, title and place of the widow of a baronet. She was also active in politics, but for the Liberal party, standing for parliament at Hendon North in 1959. Hills's son Sir Andrew Hills, 1st Baronet, died in February 1955, aged 21, when the title became extinct.

Hills was also a notable fly fishing historian and author, with published works including:
A History of Fly Fishing for Trout, 1921
 A Summer on the Test, 1930
 River Keeper: The Life of William James Lunn, 1934
 My Sporting Life, 1936

References

Sources
Who Was Who

External links 
 

1867 births
1938 deaths
Alumni of Balliol College, Oxford
People educated at Eton College
Durham Light Infantry officers
British Army personnel of World War I
Conservative Party (UK) MPs for English constituencies
Members of the Privy Council of the United Kingdom
UK MPs 1906–1910
UK MPs 1910
UK MPs 1910–1918
UK MPs 1918–1922
UK MPs 1924–1929
UK MPs 1929–1931
UK MPs 1931–1935
UK MPs 1935–1945
Members of the Parliament of the United Kingdom for City of Durham
Liberal Unionist Party MPs for English constituencies